The 2017 USA Track and Field Outdoor Championships were held at Hornet Stadium on the campus of California State University, Sacramento in Sacramento, California. Organized by USA Track & Field, the four-day competition took place June 22–25 and served as the national championships in track and field for the United States. The event was held in conjunction with the USA Track & Field Junior Outdoor Championships.

The 50 kilometers race walk was held January 28 at Santee, California.  While no men were able to make the 4:06 qualifying standard, two women were able to achieve their 4:30 qualifying time, with Katie Burnett walking faster than the second place man.  The other qualifier was former world record holder Erin Taylor-Talcott.  2017 is the first year the women will be allowed to race that distance at the world championships.

Schedule

Men's results
Key:
.

Men track events

Men field events

Men's Notes
 Since Joe Kovacs receives a bye, Darrell Hill will also represent USA at the World Championships
 Since Erik Kynard receives a bye, Jeron Robinson will also represent USA at the World Championships
 Since Damarcus Simpson did not make the qualifying standard by the deadline, 5th place Jeff Henderson will represent USA at the World Championships
 No American made the qualifying standard, but Rudy Winkler was ranked =#31 in the world on the deadline date and eventually was invited along with Alex Young and Kibwé Johnson to represent USA at the World Championships

Women's results
Key:
.

Women track events

Women field events

Women's Notes
 Since Tianna Bartoletta receives a bye, Quanesha Burks will also represent USA at the World Championships
 Since Keni Harrison receives a bye, Dawn Harper will also represent USA at the World Championships
 4th place Ashley Spencer 53.11, 5th place Georganne Moline 53.14 (all top 25 individuals in history), 6th place 17 year old Sydney McLaughlin 53.82 
 Ince was ranked #25 in the world, 2cm shy of the qualifying mark at the deadline, and eventually was invited to also represent USA at the World Championships

Masters exhibition events

Qualification

The 2017 USA Outdoor Track and Field Championships serve as the qualification meet for United States representatives in international competitions, including the 2017 World Championships in Athletics. In order to be entered, athletes need to achieve a qualifying standard mark and place in the top 3 in their event. The United States team, as managed by USATF, can also bring a qualified back up athlete in case one of the team members is unable to perform. Area champions (meaning, for North American athletes, gold medalists at the 2015 NACAC Championships) did not need to meet the qualifying standard; NACAC conducted its championships three weeks before the World Championships, thus providing one additional opportunity for qualification.

Additionally, defending World Champions and 2016 Diamond League Champions received byes into the World Championships. The athletes eligible for a bye are:

Defending World Champions
 Christian Taylor - Triple jump
 Joe Kovacs - Shot put
 Tianna Bartoletta - Long jump
 Allyson Felix - 400 meters
 Ashton Eaton - Decathlon (Eaton announced his retirement from the sport January 3, 2017, and will not defend his title)

Diamond League Champions
 LaShawn Merritt - 400 meters
 Kerron Clement - 400 m hurdles
 Erik Kynard - High jump
 Christian Taylor - Triple jump (Does not displace; already World Champion)
 Keni Harrison - 100 m hurdles
 Cassandra Tate - 400 m hurdles

Both qualified by winning their respective events in the championships.

References

External links
 USATF Championships - 6/22/2017 to 6/25/2017 Hornets Stadium, Sacramento Results. USATF Results. Retrieved on 2017-06-13.

USA Outdoor Track and Field Championships
USA Outdoors
Track, Outdoor
Sports competitions in Sacramento, California
USA Outdoor Track and Field Championships
Track and field in California